Lucas Pennacchi (born 1960 in São Paulo) is a Brazilian artist who works with painting, drawing and engraving.

Pennacchi started to draw and paint at school and with his father, Brazilian artist Fulvio Pennacchi. He went to a school of architecture, where he studied art and drawing, but left in the third year.

His themes deal with landscapes and seascapes, and compositions with birds and fish. His work is currently private collectors, and art galleries. He's a frequent collaborator with art publications, and in 2004 he was theme for a feature of Metrópolis, a widely known TV Cultura program.

He learnt mosaic  by himself, and teaches open courses at the MuBE National Museum of Sculpture in São Paulo.

References

External links
   Lucas Pennacchi, cursos, exposições,leilões, galerias, or  "Lucas Pennacchi courses, exhibitions, auctions, galleries"
   Lucas Pennacchi—personal homepage

1960 births
Living people
20th-century engravers
21st-century engravers
Brazilian painters
Brazilian engravers
Modern artists